Priscila Sol (born 14 April 1980, in São Paulo) is a Brazilian actress.

Career
Priscila Sol played some roles in TV and Cinema.

Television

Cinema

References

External links

Priscila Sol, a Paixão de "Viver a Vida", encara seu destaque sem glamour. UOL Televisão, 11 de outubro de 2009.
Priscila Sol volta às telonas. Caras, 19 de dezembro de 2009 (visitado em 11 January 2010).
Priscila Sol, a Paixão de 'Viver a vida', faz jus ao sobrenome alegre e vibrante. Ego, Globo.com, 22 de novembro de 2009 (visitado em 11 January 2010).

1980 births
Living people
Brazilian actresses